Multhan is a village in the Dhar district of Madhya Pradesh.

School's in Multhan 
Government Higher Secondary School,
Jahwar Navoday Vidhyalay,
Bharat Vidhiya Niketan

History 

An independent Princely State in present day Madhya Pradesh, it came into existence on 13th October 1656/7 in a division of territories granted to Rao Ratan Singh of Ratlam by Padshah Shahjehan of Delhi. This division was carried out by Ratan Singhji himself prior to the fateful battle of Dharmat (Fatehabad) in 1658. Each of his sons were granted a territory independent of the other. With the degeneration of the Mughal Empire, Multhan became de facto independent, and at the time of the advent of the British, the Multhan rulers were styled as Raja. The treaties signed under the aegis of Sir John Malcolm, the Multhan rulers were styled as such and as such were recognized by the British Government. The rulers of this Princely State share an agnatic descent with Ratlam, Kacchi-Baroda and Sailana, which is the younger branch of Ratlam State. Multhan has one Thikana under it by name of Sandla with Sisodia Thakurs as its Jagirdars. The title of the ruler of Multhan is Raja, and for male members of the family it is Maharaj..

During British Raj, the State consisted of 54 villages in the Badnawar pargana. The chief, Maharaj Bharat Singh ji , who was born in 1893 and succeeded on adoption in 1901, was the second son of H.H. Raja Sir Jashwant Singh II of Sailana State. The residence of the chief is the town of Multhan, situated on the Ratlam river, on the Dhar road 5 miles from Badnawar and 26 miles from Dhar city. Area 256 square miles. Population was 11,804 in 1931.

Rulers 
 1691 - 1709         Maharaj Anup Singh ji
 1709 - 17..         Maharaj Indra Singh ji
 17.. - 17..         Maharaj Raj Singh ji 
 1756 - ...          Maharaj Roop Singh ji  
 ... - ... (7 years)  Maharaj Chhatra Singh ji
 ... - ...           Maharaj  Anand Singh ji
 ... - ...           Maharaj Lakshman Singh ji 
 1810 - 1849          Maharaj Sawai Singh ji             (died 1849)
 1849 - 1900         Maharaj Dalpat Singh ji             (born 1838 - d. 1900)
 1849 - ....          Rajmata Wagheliji Man  Kunwar (f) -Regent
 1900 - 26 August 1901   interregnum
 26 August 1901 - 1947  Maharaj Bharat Singh ji          (b. 1894 - d. 1971)
 1971-1973             Maharaj Rameshwar Singh ji
 1973- present Raja of Multhan  Maharaj Raghuveer Singh ji

External links and sources 
 WorldStatesmen - India - princely States K-Z

Specific

	

Princely states of Madhya Pradesh
Rajput princely states
Jagirs